Tournedos can refer to:

 Tournedos (meat cut) , small round pieces of beef cut from the end portion of beef tenderloin, often cooked with bacon or lard
 Tournedos Rossini, a dish using this cut
 Tournedos-Bois-Hubert, a commune in northern France
 Tournedos-sur-Seine, a small town in northern France

Cuts of beef